John Bolger may refer to:

John Michael Bolger (born 1956), American actor
John A. Bolger Jr. (1908–1990), American sound engineer